Radim Kořínek (born 1 December 1973) is a Czech former competitive cyclist. He was born in Olomouc. He took part in two Olympics: the 2000 Olympic Games in Sydney, as well as the 2004 Olympics in Athens.

He was in Olpran racing team and then he went to Česká spořitelna MTB team in which he had most of his achievements. Other hobbies include hockey, tennis, and skiing. His nickname is Rades. His coach was Karel Martínek. After ending his competitive career, he founded his own bike shop and is still around cycling.

Achievements and titles
1998: MČR, MTB, cross country, 1st place
1999: MM Slovakia, MTB, cross country, 2nd place
1999: MS, Are (Šweden), MTB, cross country, 34th place
2000: Olympic Games, Sydney (Australia), Cross Country Mountain Bike, 29th place
2000: MČR, MTB, relay race, 1st place, with Kateřina Neumann and David Kašek
2002: MČR, MTB, bike marathon, 1st place
2002: MS, Kaprun (Austria), MTB, cross country, 27th place
2003: MČR, Zadov, MTB, cross country, 3rd place
2004: Olympic Games, Athens (Greece), Cross Country Mountain Bike, 22nd place
Many times he was Czech Republic Champion.

References 
Česká Spořitelna MTB
Profile 
Article about nomination of Czech bikers for OG at Sydney
Nomination for OG in Athens 
World championship list of Czech bikers

External links 
http://www.korinekbikes.cz
sports-reference

Czech male cyclists
1973 births
Living people
Cyclists at the 2000 Summer Olympics
Cyclists at the 2004 Summer Olympics
Olympic cyclists of the Czech Republic
Sportspeople from Olomouc